SEAL Team Six: The Raid on Osama Bin Laden is a 2012 television film directed by John Stockwell chronicling the Abbottabad compound raid and killing of Osama bin Laden in 2011 by U.S. Navy SEALs. It first aired on the National Geographic Channel on Sunday, November 4, 2012. The facts in the film were not confirmed or denied by White House officials. William Fichtner, Cam Gigandet, Kenneth Miller, Kathleen Robertson, and Xzibit are among the actors who appear in the film. The part of the film showcasing the Pakistan locales were shot at Khopoli near Mumbai, India as the filmmakers were unable to secure permission to shoot in Pakistan. It holds a mixed critic rating on score aggregator Metacritic.

Cast
SEAL Team Six
 Tait Fletcher as "D Punch"
 Cam Gigandet as "Stunner"
 Robert Knepper as Lieutenant Commander
 Kenneth Miller as "Sauce"
 Anson Mount as "Cherry"
 Freddy Rodriguez as "Trench"
 Xzibit as "Mule"
CIA
 William Fichtner as Mr. Guidry 
 Kristen Rakes as CIA Analyst
 Kathleen Robertson as Vivian 
 Rajesh Shringarpure as Waseem
 Eddie Kaye Thomas as Christian
Additional cast
 Lora Cunningham as TOC Tech Torres
 Jenny Gabrielle as Tricia 
 Mo Gallini as The Interrogator 
 David House as TOC Tech
 Yon Kempton as Osama Bin Laden
 Jahan Khalili as Khalid
 Keith Meriweather as TOC Commander
 Sarah Minnich as The Waitress 
 Alma Sisneros as Trench's Girlfriend 
 Saleem Watley as Al-Kuwaiti
 Harsh Chhaya as Dr. Afridi
 Maninder Singh as Malik
 Joe Cabezuela Navy SEAL Member (uncredited)

See also
 List of films featuring the United States Navy SEALs
 No Easy Day: The Firsthand Account of the Mission that Killed Osama bin Laden
 Zero Dark Thirty

References

External links
 

2012 television films
2012 films
Action television films
American drama television films
American films based on actual events
Films set in 2011
The Weinstein Company films
Works about the killing of Osama bin Laden
Films about United States Navy SEALs
Voltage Pictures films
Films set in Pakistan
Films directed by John Stockwell
2010s English-language films
Films shot in Mumbai
Films shot in Maharashtra
Films shot in India
2010s American films